Robert Frederick Inger (September 10, 1920 – April 12, 2019) was an American herpetologist.  During his lifetime, he wrote numerous books and publications about herpetology.  He was also the curator for amphibians and reptiles at the Field Museum in Chicago, Illinois.

Family

Robert Inger was the son of Jacob Inger and Anna Bourd.  In 1946 he married Mary Lee Ballew (b. 1918) who died of cancer in 1985.  In 1991 he married Tan Fui Lian (b. 1951).

Education 

Inger's high school biology teacher was Julian Steyermark, who became curator of botany at the Field Museum.  Steyermark was the role model that led Inger to the Field Museum to volunteer, where he was interviewed by Karl P. Schmidt, Dwight Davis, and Clifford H. Pope. As a result of this volunteer work, Inger had authored or coauthored five publications before graduating from high school. In 1942, Inger received a Bachelor of Science from the University of Chicago.  After first being turned down due to poor eyesight, he was drafted into the Army Corps of Engineers and placed in a unit of General Patton's Army in France and Germany making maps from the ground. He was discharged in 1945 near St. Louis.  Inger returned to the University of Chicago for graduate work, with his principal mentor being Karl P. Schmidt, who suggested that he do his dissertation on the systematics and zoogeography of the Philippine Amphibia (Inger, 1954), using the
extensive collection at the Field Museum.

Career 

Inger's herpetology career began with volunteer work at the Field Museum, where he was eventually hired as assistant curator of fishes in 1949.  He then succeeded Clifford Pope as curator of amphibians and reptiles in 1954. He retired from this position in September 1994; however, he continued lab and field work in the museum as curator emeritus.

Inger served as president of the Society of Systematic Zoology in 1971, president of American Society of Ichthyology and Herpetology in 1974, and president of the Herpetologists' League in 1982–1983. He was an editor for Evolution and the American Midland Naturalist and a sectional editor (herpetology) for Copeia. He also served on the board of the Illinois Chapter of The Nature Conservancy.  In January 2007 Yang di-Pertua Negeri Tun Abang Muhammad Salahuddin Abang Barieng conferred on Inger the honorary Panglima Setia Bintang Sarawak (PSBS), which carries the title Datuk.  This honor was conferred in recognition of Inger's 50 years of field work in Borneo describing, cataloguing and publishing on the taxonomy and ecology of herpetofauna in Sarawak.

On April 12, 2019, Inger died at the age of 98.

Taxa

Taxa named for Robert F. Inger
Over 40 species are named in his honor.

Reptiles
Calamaria ingeri 
Cyrtodactylus ingeri 
Dibamus ingeri 
Erythrolamprus ingeri 
Phyllodactylus tuberculosus ingeri 

Amphibians
Ameerega ingeri
Pelophryne ingeri

Fishes
Gastromyzon ingeri 
Halieutopsis ingerorum 
Osteochilus ingeri 
Stenogobius ingeri

Species described by Robert F. Inger 

Over 75 species have been described by him.

Publications
He has written 8 books and more than 130 peer-reviewed articles.

Books

 1957 Living Reptiles of the World with Karl Patterson Schmidt
 1966 The Reptiles
 1989 The Frogs of Sabah with R. B. Stuebing
 1996 The Natural History of Amphibians and Reptiles in Sabah with Tan Fui Lian
 1997 A Field Guide to the Frogs of Borneo with R. B. Stuebing
 1999 A Field Guide to the Snakes of Borneo with R. B. Stuebing
 2005 A Field Guide to the Frogs of Borneo 2nd Edition with R. B. Stuebing
 2010 Natural History Of Amphibians And Reptiles In Sabah 2nd Edition with Tan Fui Lian

Other publications
 1942. Scale reduction in snakes. Copeia 1942:163–170 with P. J. Clark
 1942. Scale reduction in certain non-colubrid snakes. Copeia 1942:230–232 with P. J. Clark
 1942. Differential selection of variant juvenile snakes. Amer. Nat. 76:527–528.
 1943. Partition of the genus Coluber. Copeia 1943:141–145. with P. J. Clark
 1943. Further notes on differential selection of variant juvenile snakes. Amer. Nat. 77:87–90.
 1946. Restriction of the type locality of Thamnophis sirtalis. Copeia 1946:254.
 1947. Preliminary survey of the amphibians of the Riu Kiu Islands. Fieldiana:Zool. 32:297–352. Biodiversity Heritage Library fulltext
 1948. The systematic status of the crocodile Osteoblepharon osborni. Copeia 1948:15–19.
 1949. Notes on a collection of fresh-water fishes from Trinidad. Copeia 1949: 300.
 1950. Distribution and speciation of amphibians of the Riu Kiu Islands. Amer. Nat. 84:95–115.
 1951. Amphibians and reptiles of the Hopkins-Branner expedition to Brazil. Fieldiana:Zool. 31:439–465. Biodiversity Heritage Library fulltext
 1953. A new fish from North Borneo: genus Tetraodon. Fieldiana:Zool. 34:149–152. Biodiversity Heritage Library fulltext
 1954. Systematics and zoogeographyof Philippine Amphibia. Fieldiana:Zool.33:183–531
 1954. On a collection of amphibians from Mount Kinabalu, North Borneo. J. Washington Acad. Sci. 44:250–251.
 1955. Ecological notes on the fis fauna of a coastal drainage of North Borneo. Fieldiana:Zool. 32:47–90.
 1955. Notes on snakes of the genus Calamaria. Fieldiana:Zool. 37:167–209. with Hymen Marx
 1955. a revision of the fishes of the genus Plesiops Cuvier. Pacific Sci. 9:259–276.
 1956. Some amphibians from the lowlands of North Borneo. Fieldiana:Zool. 34:389–424.
 1956. Notes on a collection of fishes from southeastern Venezuela. Fieldiana:Zool. 34:425–440.
 1956. Morphology and development of the vocal sac apparatus in the African frog Rana (Ptychadena) porossima Steindachner. J. Morph. 99:57–72.
 1956. Morphology and seasonal development of sex characters in two sympatric African toads. J. Morph. 99:549–574 with B. Greenberg
 1957. Report on a collection of marine fishes from North Borneo. Fieldiana:Zool. 36:341–405.
 1957. Ecological aspects of the origins of the tetrapods. Evol. 11:373–376.
 1957. The cave, spring, and swamp fishes of the family Amblyopsidae of central and eastern United States. Amer. Midl. Nat. 58:232–256 with L. P. Woods
 1958. A note on the Philippine frogs related to Rana macrodon. Fieldiana:Zool. 39:253–255.
 1958. Three new skinks related to Sphenomorphus variegates (Peters). Fieldiana:Zool. 39:257–268. Biodiversity Heritage Library fulltext
 1958. The vocal sac of the Colorado River toad Bufo alvarius (Girard). Texas J. Sci. 10:319–324.
 1958. Comments on the definition of genera. Evol 12:370–384.
 1958. A new gecko of the genus Cyrtodactylus, with a key to the species from Borneo and the Philippine Islands. Sarawak Mus. J. 8:261–264.
 1958. Notes on fishes of the genus Brachygobius. Fieldiana:Zool. 39:107–117.
 1958. Notes on the Bornean glass snake. Sarawak Mus. J. 8:479–481.
 1958. A new toad from Sarawak. Sarawak Mus. J. 8:476–478.
 1959. Temperature responses and ecological relations of two Bornean lizards. Ecol. 40:127–136.
 1959. Amphibians exclusive of the genera Afrixalus and Hyperolius. Exploration du Parc national de l’Upemba, Inst. Parc Nat. Congo Belge, Fasc. 56, 264 pp. with K. P. Schmidt
 1959. Amphibia. South African Animal Life 6:510–553.
 1959. New species of fresh-water catfishes from North Borneo. Fieldiana:Zool. 39:279–296.
 1960. Notes on toads of the genus Pelophryne. Fieldiana:Zool. 39:415–418.
 1960. A review of the agamid lizards of the genus Phoxophrys Hubrecht. Copeia 1960:221–225.
 1960. A review of the Oriental toads of the genus Ansonia. Fieldiana:Zool. 39:473–503.
 1961. A new pelobatid frog of the genus Megophrys from Hong Kong. Fieldiana:Zool. 39:533–538. with J. D. Romer
 1961. Notes on two New Guinean lizards of the genus Sphenomorphus. Fieldiana:Zool. 39:539–542.
 1961. The food of amphibians. Exploration du Parc national de l’Upemba, Inst. Parc Nat. du Congo et Ruanda-Urundi, Fasc. 64, 86 pp. with H. Marx
 1961. The Bornean cyprinid fishes of the genus Gastromyzon Günther. Copeia 1961:166–176.
 1961. A new species of toad (Bufo) from Sierra Leone. Fieldiana:Zool. 39:589–594.PDF fulltext
 1961. Problems in the application of the subspecies concept in vertebrate taxonomy. Univ. Texas Symposium on Vertebrate Taxonomy, pp. 262–285.
 1961. A new colubrid snake of the genus Pseudorabdion from Sumatra. Fieldiana:Zool. 44:45–47. with A. E. Leviton
 1961. A new cave dwelling lizard of the genus Cyrtodactylus. Sarawak Mus. J. 10:274–276. with F. W. King
 1962. The fresh-water fishes of North Borneo. Fieldiana:Zool. 45:1–268. with Chin P.-K.
 1962. Variation of hemipenis and cloaca in the colubrid snake, Calamaria lumbricoidea. Syst. Zool. 11:32–38. with H. Marx
 1962. On the terrestrial origin of frogs. Copeia 1962:835–836.
 1963. The annual reproductive pattern of the frog Rana erythraea in Sarawak. Phys. Zool. 36:21–33. with B. Greenberg
 1964. The taxonomic status of the frog Cornufer dorsalis A Duméril. Copeia 1964:450–451. with W. C. Brown
 1964. Two new species of frogs from Borneo. Fieldiana:Zool. 44:151–159.
 1965. The systematics and evolution of the Oriental colubrid snakes of the Genus Calamaria. Fieldiana:Zool. 49:1–304. with H. Marx
 1965. New species of scincid lizards of the genus Sphenomorphus from Sarawak. Israel J. Zool. 14:134–140. with W. Hosmer
 1966. The taxonomic status of Bornean snakes of the genus Pseudorabdion Jan and of the nominal genus Idiopholis Mocquard. Proc. California Acad. Sci. 34:307–314. with A. E. Leviton
 1966. The systematics and zoogeography of the Amphibia of Borneo. Fieldiana:Zoology 33:183–531.
 1966. Ecological and competitive relations among three species of frogs (genus Rana). Ecol. 47:746–759. with B. Greenberg
 1966. Annual reproductive patterns of lizards from a Bornean rain forest. Ecol. 47:1007–1021. with B. Greenberg
 1967. The development of a phylogeny of frogs. Evol. 21:369–384.
 1967. A new colubrid snake of the genus Stegonotus from Borneo. Fieldiana:Zool. 51:77–83.
 1968. Annual reproduction and clutch size in rain forest frogs from Sarawak. Copeia 1968:602–606. with J. P. Bacon
 1968. On the diversity of reptile and amphibian species in a Bornean rain forest. Amer. Nat. 102:497–515. with M. Lloyd & F. W. King
 1968. Amphibia. Exploration du Parc Nat. de la Garamba, Fasc. 52, 190 pp.
 1969. Organization of communities of frogs along small rain forest streams in Sarawak. J. Animal Ecol. 38:123–148.
 1970. A new species of frog of the genus Rana from Thailand. Fieldiana:Zool. 51:169–174.
 1972. Bufo from Eurasia. In Evolution in the genus Bufo. Ed. W. F. Blair, Univ. Texas Press, pp. 102–118, 357-360.
 1973. Numerical taxonomy. Caldasia 11:72–88.
 1974. Genetic variation and population ecology of some Southeast Asian frogs of the genera Bufo and Rana. Genetics 12:121–145. with H. K. and H. H. Voris
 1977. Organization of contiguous communities of amphibians and reptiles in Thailand. Ecol. Monogr. 47:229–253. with R. K. Colwell
 1979. Abundances of amphibians and reptiles in tropical forests of Southeast Asia. Trans 6th Aberdeen-Hull Symposium on Malesian Ecology. Ed. A. G. Marshall. Univ. Hull Dept. Geography, Misc. Ser., No. 22, pp. 92–110.
 1980. Species of the scincid genus Dasia Gray. Fieldiana:Zool. (n.s.), no. 3, 11 pp. with W. C. Brown
 1980. Relative abundances of frogs and lizards in forest of Southeast Asia. Biotropica 12:14–22.
 1980. Densities of floor-dwelling frogs and lizards in lowland forests of Southeast Asia and Central America. Amer. Nat. 115:761–770.
 1980. New species of narrow-mouth frogs (genus Microhyla) from Borneo. Sarawak Mus. J. 27:311–322. with K. J. Frogner
 1981. Adaptation for life in tree holes by rhacophorid tadpoles from Thailand. J. Herpetology 15:41–52. with R. J. Wassersug & K. J. Frogner
 1983. Larvae of Southeast Asian species of Leptobrachium and Leptobrachella (Anura: Pelobaatidae). in Advances in Herpetology and Evolutionary Biology. eds. Rhodin & Miyata, pp. 13–32.
 1983. Morphological and ecological variation in the flying lizards (genus Draco). Fieldiana:Zool. (n.s.) no. 18, 35 pp.
 1983. Variation in Bornean frogs of the Amolops jerboa species group, with description of two new species. Fieldiana:Zool. (n.s.), no. 19, 13 pp. with P. Gritis
 1984. An undescribed species of gekkonid lizard (Cnemaspis) from India with comments on the status of C. tropidogaster. Herpetologica 40:149–154. with H. Marx & M. Koshy
 1984. A report on a collection of amphibians and reptiles from Ponmudi, Kerala, South India. J. Bombay Nat. Hist. Sc. 81:551–570. with H. B. Shaffer, M. Koshy & R. Bakde
 1985. Tadpoles of the forested regions of Borneo. Fieldiana:Zool. (n.s.), No. 22, 89 pp.
 1985. A key to the frogs of Sarawak. Sarawak Mus. J. 34:161–182. with H. K. Voris & P. Walker
 1986. Larval transport in a Bornean ranid frog. Copeia 1986:523–525. with H. K. Voris & P. Walker
 1986. Organization of a community of tadpoles in rain forest streams in Borneo. J. Tropical Ecol. 2:193–205. with H. K. Voris & K. J. Frogner
 1986. Diets of tadpoles living in a Bornean rain forest. Alytes 5:153–164.
 1987. Ecological structure of a herpetological assemblage in South India Amphibia-Reptilia 8:189–202. with H. B. Shaffer, M. Koshy & R. Bakde
 1987. An overview of the amphibian fauna of India. J. Bombay Nat Hist. Soc. 83 (Supplement): 135–146. with S. K. Dutta
 1988. Taxonomic and ecological relations of Bornean stream toads allied to Ansonia leptopus (Günther) (anura:Bufonidae). Malayan Nat. J. 41:461–471. with J. Dring
 1988. Taxonomic status and reproductive biology of Bornean tadpole-carrying frogs. Copeia 1988:1060–1062.
 1989. Developmental differences in visceral morphology of megophryine pelobatid tadpoles in relation to their body form and mode of life. Biol. J. Linnaean Soc. 38:369–388. with E. Nodzenski & R. J. Wassersug
 1989. Ecological and geographic distribution of the amphibians of Sichuan, China. Copeia 1989:549–557. with E. Zhao & G. Wu
 1989. Four new species of frogs from Borneo. Malayan Nat. J. 42:229–243.
 1989. A new species of gasteromyzontine fish, Gastromyzon danumensis from Sabah, Borneo. Malayan Nat. J. 43:53–58. with Chin P.-K.
 1990. A centrolenid-like anuran larva from Southeast Asia. Zool. Sci. 7:557–561. with R. J. Wassersug
 1990. Report on a collection of amphibians and reptiles from Sichuan, China. Fieldiana:Zool. (n.s.), no. 58, 24 pp. with E. Zhao, H. B. Shaffer & G. Wu
 1990. Recently discovered and newly assigned frog larvae (Ranidae and Rhacophoridae) from Borneo. Raffles Bull. Zool. 38:3–9. with Tan F.-L.
 1991. A new species of frog of the genus Leptobrachella Smith (Anura:Pelobatidae), with a key to the species from Borneo. Raffles Bull. Zool. 39:99–103. with R. B. Stuebing
 1991. Uncoupling of related structural changes in metamorphosing torrentdwelling tadpoles. Copeia 1990:1047–1054. with E. Nodzenski
 1992. Variation of apomorphic characters in the stream-dwelling tadpoles of the bufonid genus Ansonia (Amphibia: Anura). Zool. J. Linnaean Soc. 105:225–237.
 1992. A biphasic feeding system in a stream-dwelling larval form of Rhacophorus from Borneo. Copeia 1992:887–890.
 1992. Comparative ecology of voiced and voiceless Bornean frogs. J. Herpetology 26:482–490. with S. B. Emerson
 1993. The montane amphibian fauna of northwestern Borneo. Malayan Nat. J. 46:41–51. with R. B. Stuebing
 1993. A new frog of the genus Oreolalax (Pelobatidae) from Sichuan, China. J. Herpetology 27:410–413. with G. F. Wu, E. Zhao & H. B. Shaffer
 1993. A comparison of amphibian communities through time and from place to place. Journal of Tropical Ecology. with H. K. Voris
 1994. Morphological variation and ecological distribution of co-occurring larval forms of Oreolalax (Anura: Pelobatidae). Amphibia-Reptilia 15:109–121. with G. F. Wu, H. B. Shaffer & E. Zhao
 1994. First record of the lizard genus Pseudocalotes (Lacertilia: Agamidae) in Borneo, with description of a new species. Raffles Bull. Zool. 42:961–965. with R. B. Stuebing
 1995. New species and new records of anurans from Borneo. Raffles Bull. Zool. 43:115–131. with R. B. Stuebing & Tan F.-L.
 1995. Frog abundance along streams in Bornean forests. Conserv. Biol. 9:679–684. with H. K. Voris
 1996. Commentary on a proposed classification of the Family Ranidae. Herpetologica 52:241–246.
 1996. Two new species of frogs from southeastern Sarawak. Raffles Bull. Zool. 44:543–549. with R. B. Stuebing
 1996. Frogs and toads of Kinabalu. in Kinabalu Summit of Borneo. eds. K. M. Wong & A Phillipps, pp. 353–367. with R. B. Stuebing & Tan F.-L.
 1996. Checklist of the frogs of Borneo. Raffles Bull. Zool. 44:551–574. with Tan F.-L.
 1996. New species of ranid frogs (Amphibia:Anura) from Central Kalimantan, Borneo. Raffles Bull. Zool. 44:363–369. with Boeadi & A. Taufik
 1997 A new species of Leptolalax (Anura: Megophryidae) from Borneo. Asiatic Herp. Research 7:48–50. with M. Lakim, A. Buin, & P Yambun
 1997. A new species of ranid frog from Thailand, with comments on Rana livida (Blyth). Nat. Hist. Bull. Siam Soc. 45:65–70. with T. Chan-ard
 1998. A new species of ranid frog from Laos. Raffles Bull. Zool. 46:29–34. with M. Kottelat
 1998. Rediscovery of the agamid lizard Calotes kinabaluensis de Grijs (Lacertilia:Agamidae) in Borneo, with notes on its habitat. Herp. Rev. 29:143–144. with M. Lakim
 1998. Additional records on two rare snakes from Borneo, with the confirmation of Trimeresurus malcolmi Loveridge as a distinct species. Raffles Bull. Zool. 46:325–328.
 1999. Frogs of Vietnam: a report on new collections. Fieldiana Zool. (n.s.), no. 92, 46 pp. with N. Orlov & I. Darevsky PDF fulltext
 1999. Distribution of amphibians of Southern Asia and adjacent islands. in Patterns of distribution of amphibians. ed.W. E. Duellman. Johns Hopkins Univ. Press. pp. 445–482.
 2000. Notes on the Bornean treefrog Philautus ingeri Dring. Sabah Mus. J. 1:9–12. with A. Wong
 2001. Molecular systematics and biogeography of the fanged frogs of Southeast Asia. Mol. Phylog. Evol. 16:131–142. with S. B. Emerson & D. T. Iskandar
 2002. The frog fauna of three parks in Sabah, Malaysia—Kinabalu Park, Crocker Range Park, and Tawau Hills Park. Sabah Parks Nat. J. 3:7–28. with Tan F.-L. & P. Yambun
 2001. The biogeographical relations of the frogs and snakes of Sundaland. J. Biogeogr. 28:863–889. with H. K. Voris
 2001. A new species of toad of the genus Ansonia (Anura: Bufonidae) from Borneo. Raffles Bull. Zool. 49:35–38. with Tan F.-L. & P. Yambun
 2003. New species of the lizard genus Sphenomorphus (Lacertilia: Scincidae) with notes on ecological and geographic distribution of species in Sabah, Malaysia. Raffles Bull. Zool. 49:181–190. with Tan F.-L., M. Lakim & P. Yambun
 2003. Sampling biodiversity in Bornean frogs. Nat. Hist. J. Chulalongkorn Univ. 3:9–15.
 2005. A collection of amphibians from West Sumatra, with description of a new species of Megophrys (Amphibia: Anura). Raffles Bull. Zool. 53: 133–142. with D. T. Iskandar
 2005. The frog fauna of the Indo-Malayan region as it applies to Wallace's Line. in Wallace in Sarawak. eds. A. A. Tuen & I. Das, pp. 82–90.
 2006. High level of cryptic species diversity revealed by sympatric lineages of Southeast Asian forest frogs. Biology Letters (2006) 2:470–474. with B. L. Stuart & H. K. Voris
 2006. The tadpole of Rana glandulosa Boulenger (Anura:Ranidae). Raffles Bull. Zool. 54:465–467.
 2009. Systematics of a widespread Southeast Asian frog, Rana chalconota (Amphibia: Anura: Ranidae). Zool. J. Linnean Soc. 155:123–147.
 2009. New species and new records of Bornean frogs (Amphibia: Anura). Raffles Bull. Zool. 57:527–535.

References

External links
 Field Museum Staff Biography: Robert F. Inger
 A Tribute to Robert F. Inger on his 90th Birthday
 Robert F. Inger Curriculum Vitae

1920 births
2019 deaths
American herpetologists
21st-century American zoologists
University of Chicago alumni
People associated with the Field Museum of Natural History